Mictopsichia shuara is a species of moth of the family Tortricidae. It is found in Ecuador.

The wingspan is about 17 mm. The ground colour of the forewings is yellowish cream, densely reticulate (net like) brownish and more yellow along the costa. The hindwings are yellowish cream, tinged orange between markings posteriorly.

Etymology
The species is named for the indigenous group of the Shuar who live in the region around Macas where the species was found.

References

Moths described in 2010
Mictopsichia
Moths of South America
Taxa named by Józef Razowski